This is a list of all tornadoes that were confirmed by local offices of the National Weather Service in the United States from May to June 2012.

United States yearly total

May

May 1 event

May 2 event

May 3 event

May 4 event

May 6 event

May 8 event

May 9 event

May 10 event

May 11 event

May 12 event

May 13 event

May 14 event

May 18 event

May 19 event

May 21 event

May 22 event

May 23 event

May 24 event

May 25 event

May 27 event

May 28 event
The event in Florida was related to Tropical Storm Beryl.

May 29 event
The events in Florida and South Carolina were related to Tropical Storm Beryl.

May 30 event
The event in North Carolina was related to Tropical Storm Beryl.

June

June 1 event

June 2 event

June 3 event

June 4 event

June 5 event

June 6 event

June 7 event

June 8 event

June 10 event

June 11 event

June 12 event

June 13 event

June 14 event

June 15 event

June 16 event

June 17 event

June 18 event

June 20 event

June 22 event

June 23 event
The events in Florida were related to Tropical Storm Debby.

June 24 event
The events in Florida were related to Tropical Storm Debby.

June 25 event

June 26 event
The event in Florida was related to Tropical Storm Debby.

June 30 event

See also
 Tornadoes of 2012

Notes

References

 05
2012-05
2012-05
Tornado,2012-05
Tornado
Tornado